The 2000 Currie Cup Qualification tournament was the first stage of the 2000 Currie Cup season, the 62nd season of the competition since it started in 1889. Following this tournament, eight teams qualified for the 2000 Currie Cup Top 8 competition, and six teams for the 2000 Bankfin Cup competition.

Competition

There were fourteen participating teams in the 2000 Currie Cup qualification tournament. They were divided into two sections, Section X and Section Y. Each team played every other team in their section once. The top four teams in each of the two sections qualified for the 2000 Currie Cup Top 8. Only points earned against other Top 8 qualifiers during the preliminary rounds were carried forward to the Top 8. The eight teams in the Top 8 played for the Currie Cup, and the three bottom-placed teams in the section qualified for the second-tier 2000 Bankfin Cup.

All points earned against the other qualifying teams from the same competition were carried forward into the next competition.

Teams received four points for a win and two points for a draw. Bonus points were awarded to teams that scored four or more tries in a game, as well as to teams that lost a match by seven points or less. The ranking position of each team was first determined by total log points, then by point difference (match points scored minus match points conceded).

Section X

Team Listing

Log

Results

Round One

Round Two

Round Three

Round Four

Round Five

Round Six

Round Seven

Section Y

Team Listing

Log

Results

Round One

Round Two

Round Three

Round Four

Round Five

Round Six

Round Seven

See also
 2000 Currie Cup Top 8
 2000 Bankfin Cup

References

2000
2000 Currie Cup